is a run and gun video game for the Neo-Geo console/arcade platform created by Mega Enterprise along with Noise Factory. It was released in 2002 for the Neo-Geo MVS arcade platform, and is the fourth game in the Metal Slug series. Two years later, Playmore published Metal Slug 4 for consoles.

Metal Slug 4 retains the same gameplay as previous titles, with the addition of some enemies, bosses, weapons, several  vehicles and a bonus combo system. It was ported to Xbox and PlayStation 2 as a stand-alone game in Japan and Europe, and along with Metal Slug 5 as a compilation in North America and South Korea. The Nintendo Switch version was released in 2018.

Gameplay 

A bonus scoring system was added that allows the player to be rewarded depending on how many enemies are killed in the time allotted. The time allotted is determined from the type of emblem that is picked up. A time meter will appear on the top of the screen, and if the player lives through the end of the level, they will be awarded bonus points for badges that represent feats accomplished. Eri and Tarma were replaced with Nadia and Trevor.

Plot
One year after the events of Metal Slug 3 and 6, the world is under the threat of a mysterious and deadly cyber virus that threatens to attack and destroy any nation's military computer system. With Tarma Roving and Eri Kasamoto unable to help out due to their own assignments in the matter, Marco Rossi and Fiolina Germi are called in to investigate the situation and are joined by two newcomers, Nadia Cassel and Trevor Spacey. In their investigation, the group discovers that a rich terrorist organization known as the Amadeus Syndicate is behind the plot and has allied with General Morden's Rebel Army. They head into battle against Amadeus' forces, hoping to destroy the cyber virus before it gets the chance to wipe out the entire world's military computer system.

Halfway through the game's story mode, the player is confronted by who they presume to be General Morden. In the final stage, they find an underground facility where android doubles of Morden are being manufactured. Allen O' Neil fights the player and is also revealed to be a machine replica. The player confronts the leader of the syndicate, a man tentatively called "Doctor", who attacks with a series of powerful robots, but he is defeated and is trapped in his own devices as the base self-destructs, killing him. If the player safely escapes the base's bonus explosion stage, the credits will show the main cast eating a feast of food, but if the player gets caught in the explosion, the player character will appear in the hospital, bandaged and bed-ridden, being brought get-well gifts of food from both Tarma and Eri. After the credits, a single computer monitor is seen transmitting data to an unknown location before shutting down.

Reception

In Japan, Game Machine listed Metal Slug 4 on their May 1, 2002 issue as being the second most-successful arcade game of the month.

Metal Slug 4 was mixed to positive received by players with users scores of 7.8 for PS2, 7.3 for Xbox, 8.1 for Neo Geo and 8.3 for the arcade versions, while Metacritic and Gamrankings are given with 70.47% and 70 along with Metal Slug 5 as compilation for both PS2 and Xbox score.

Notes

References

External links 
 
 Metal Slug 4 at GameFAQs
 Metal Slug 4 at Giant Bomb
 Metal Slug 4 at Killer List of Videogames
 Metal Slug 4 at MobyGames

2002 video games
ACA Neo Geo games
Arcade video games
Cooperative video games
D4 Enterprise games
Metal Slug
Multiplayer and single-player video games
Neo Geo games
Nintendo Switch games
PlayStation 2 games
PlayStation Network games
PlayStation 4 games
SNK Playmore games
Video game sequels
Video games developed in Japan
Video games developed in South Korea
Video games featuring female protagonists
Video games set in Berlin
Video games set in Canada
Video games set in Finland
Video games set in Germany
Video games set in Italy
Video games set in New York City
Virtual Console games
Xbox games
Xbox One games
Video games about terrorism
Video games about zombies
UTV Ignition Games games
Hamster Corporation games